William Dooley (born 26 March 1969) is an Irish former hurler who played for Offaly Senior Championship club Seir Kieran. He played for the Offaly senior hurling team for 11 seasons, during which time he usually lined out as a right corner-forward. Dooley, together with his brothers Joe and Johnny, formed the backbone of the Offaly attack for over a decade.

Dooley began his hurling career at club level with Seir Kieran. He broke onto the club's top adult team as an 18-year-old when he lined out as a goalkeeper in the 1987 Offaly Championship. Having earlier won under-16 and minor championship titles, Dooley won Offaly Senior Championship titles in 1988, 1995, 1996 and 1998.

At inter-county level, Dooley was part of the Offaly minor team that won back-to-back All-Ireland Championships in 1986 and 1987, before later ending up as an All-Ireland Championship runner-up with the Offaly under-21 team in 1989. He joined the Offaly senior team in 1988. After a slow start to his senior career, Dooley eventually became an ever-present figure at corner-forward and made a combined total of 66 National League and Championship appearances in a career that ended with his last game in 1999. During that time he was part of two All-Ireland Championship-winning teams – in 1994 and 1998. Dooley also secured two Leinster Championship medals and a National Hurling League medal.

Dooley won his first All-Star in 1994, before claiming a second successive award in 1995.

Honours

Team
St Brendan's Community School
Dr Croke Cup (1): 1986
Leinster Colleges Senior Hurling Championship (2): 1985, 1986

Seir Kieran
Offaly Senior Hurling Championship (4): 1988, 1995, 1996, 1998

Offaly
All-Ireland Senior Hurling Championship (2): 1994, 1998
Leinster Senior Hurling Championship (2): 1994, 1995
National Hurling League (1): 1990-91
Leinster Under-21 Hurling Championship (1): 1989
All-Ireland Minor Hurling Championship (2): 1986, 1987
Leinster Minor Hurling Championship (2): 1986, 1987

Individual
Awards
All-Star (2): 1994, 1995

References

1969 births
Living people
All Stars Awards winners (hurling)
Billy
Hurling goalkeepers
Irish builders
Offaly inter-county hurlers
People from Tullamore, County Offaly
Seir Kieran hurlers